State Road 9 in the U.S. State of Indiana is a long north–south state highway in the eastern portion of Indiana.  Its southern terminus is near Columbus at State Road 46, and the northern terminus is at the Michigan/Indiana border between Howe, Indiana, and Sturgis, Michigan, where it continues as M-66.

Some of Indiana 9 is divided highway and even freeway, but Interstate 69 largely supplants it as all but a regional route between Huntington and Anderson.

Route description

Columbus to Shelbyville 
SR 9 heads north from its southern terminus at State Road 46 (SR 46).  SR 9 passes through Hope on the way to the eastern terminus of the western section of State Road 252 (SR 252). North of SR 252, SR 9 heads northeast then northwest toward Shelbyville.  SR 9 enters Shelbyville from the south and has an intersection with State Road 44 (SR 44).

Shelbyville to Anderson 
North of SR 44, SR 9 continues into downtown Shelbyville and then continues north passing over Interstate 74/U.S. Route 421.  SR 9 heads north toward Greenfield, in Greenfield SR 9 has an intersection with U.S. Route 40 and an interchange with Interstate 70.  Then SR 9 heads north toward Pendleton.  In Pendleton SR 9 has a concurrency with U.S. Route 36 and State Road 67.  Then SR 9 merges onto interstate 69 before the concurrency ends at the next exit.  Then SR 9 heads north toward downtown Anderson, passing Harrah's Hoosier Park Racing and Casino.

Anderson to Huntington 
SR 9 passes east of downtown Anderson and heads north out of Anderson.  SR 9 passes just east of Alexandria, then just north of Alexandria SR 9 has an intersection with State Road 28.  Then SR 9 has an intersection with State Road 26, just west of Fairmount.  Then SR 9 enters Marion, where SR 9 has an intersection with U.S. Route 35/State Road 22 followed by an intersection with State Road 37.  Then just south of downtown Marion SR 9 has a concurrency with State Road 15.  In downtown Marion SR 9 and SR 15 has an intersection with State Road 18.  Then north of downtown Marion SR 15 turns northwest toward Wabash and SR 9 turns northeast toward Huntington.  On the way to Huntington SR 9 passes near Mt. Etna.  Then SR 9 enters Huntington on the southwest side of town.

Huntington to Columbia City 
SR 9 bypasses Huntington on the west side of town, concurrent with U.S. Route 24.  On the northeast side of Huntington US 24 and SR 9 have an intersection with U.S. Route 224 and State Road 5.  Then SR 9 leaves the bypass on the north side of Huntington and heads north towards Columbia City, passing through an intersection with State Road 114 and State Road 14.  SR 9 enters Columbia City on the south side of town.  After it enters Columbia City SR 9 has a concurrency with State Road 205.  The concurrency ends in downtown Columbia City at Old U.S. Route 30, where SR 205 turns east.

Columbia City to Michigan 
SR 9 heads north out of downtown Columbia City.  Before leaving Columbia City SR 9 has an intersection with U.S. Route 30.  SR 9 heads north passing through an intersection with U.S. Route 33 and passing near Chain O'Lakes State Park.  Then SR 9 enters Albion on the south part of town.  In downtown Albion SR 9 has an intersection at the western terminus of State Road 8.  SR 9 heads north out of Albion, then SR 9 has a concurrency with U.S. Route 6.  It then heads north, passing through Rome City and Wolcottville.  In Lagrange, SR 9 has an intersection with U.S. Route 20 and continues north towards the Michigan state line.  Before the Michigan state line, SR 9 passes through an intersection with State Road 120 in Howe.  Then just south of the Michigan state line, SR 9 has an intersection with the Indiana Toll Road (Interstate 80/Interstate 90).  Then SR 9 crosses into Michigan as M-66 heading north toward Sturgis.

History
From 1917 to 1926 the current route of SR 9 was known as State Road 11.  With the SR 9 given to a route that went from Linton to Brazil and a second section from Rockville to Old State Road 10.

Explanation of nickname 
The nickname of State Road 9 is Highway of Vice Presidents, from Shelbyville to Columbia City.  The reason for the name is that four of Indiana's six Vice Presidents lived in cities along the route:
Thomas A. Hendricks — Grover Cleveland's Vice President (1885) from Shelbyville
Thomas R. Marshall — Woodrow Wilson's Vice President (1913–1921) from Columbia City
J. Danforth Quayle — George H.W. Bush's Vice President (1989–1993) from Huntington
Michael R. Pence - Donald J. Trump's Vice President (2017—2021) from Columbus
 

Indiana's other two vice presidents are also honored by the highway nickname:
Schuyler Colfax — Ulysses S. Grant's Vice President (1869–1873) from South Bend
Charles W. Fairbanks — Theodore Roosevelt's Vice President (1905–1909) from Indianapolis

Major intersections

References

External links

009
Transportation in Shelby County, Indiana
Transportation in Hancock County, Indiana
Transportation in Madison County, Indiana
Transportation in Bartholomew County, Indiana
Transportation in Grant County, Indiana
Transportation in Huntington County, Indiana
Transportation in Hamilton County, Indiana
Transportation in Whitley County, Indiana
Transportation in Noble County, Indiana
Transportation in LaGrange County, Indiana